Chen Puru (March 1918 – December 11, 1998) was a politician of the People's Republic of China. 

Born in Boxing, Shandong, Chen joined the Communist Party of China (CPC) in October 1937. In January 1980, Chen became the governor of Liaoning Province. From April 1982 to April 1985, Chen served as the Minister of Railways of China. 

Chen was a member of 11th and 12th Central Committees of the Communist Party of China, and a member of 13th Central Advisory Committee of CPC. 

He died on December 11, 1998 in Beijing.

1918 births
1998 deaths
Politicians from Binzhou
People's Republic of China politicians from Shandong
Chinese Communist Party politicians from Shandong
Governors of Liaoning